Saint-Floxel is a commune in the Manche department in Normandy in north-western France.

References

Saintfloxel